Keep the Last Bullet for Yourself is a compilation album by the American grunge band Paw. It was released in 1998 through the band's own record label, Outlaw Records. The record is a collection of covers and B-sides that the band had recorded over the years. The album was sold for a brief period online and at the band's live performances, but it is now out of print. The Cheap Trick cover "Surrender," released as a single in 1994, was also included in the compilation.

Track listing
"Slowburn (BBC Session)" – 2:19
"Street Justice" (Twisted Sister cover, Strangeland Soundtrack outtake) – 3:37
"I Know Where You Sleep" (B-Side) – 4:37
"Imaginary Lover" (Atlanta Rhythm Section cover, B-Side) – 4:37
"30 Days" (Death To Traitors outtake) – 2:28
"Surrender" (Cheap Trick cover from the S.F.W. soundtrack) – 3:56
"The Bridge (BBC Session)" – 3:47
"Remora" (Death To Traitors outtake) – 2:47
"Kid Cotton" (B-Side) – 4:16
"School" (Nirvana cover, B-Side) – 2:56

References

Paw (band) albums
Grunge compilation albums
1990 compilation albums